The canton of Saint-Germain-du-Puy is an administrative division of the Cher department, in central France. It was created at the French canton reorganisation which came into effect in March 2015. Its seat is in Saint-Germain-du-Puy.

It consists of the following communes: 
 
Les Aix-d'Angillon 
Aubinges
Azy
Brécy
La Chapelotte
Henrichemont
Humbligny
Montigny
Morogues
Neuilly-en-Sancerre
Neuvy-Deux-Clochers
Parassy
Rians
Saint-Céols
Saint-Germain-du-Puy
Saint-Michel-de-Volangis
Sainte-Solange
Soulangis

References

Cantons of Cher (department)